"Moses" is a song by British rock band Coldplay. It was written by all members of the band for their live album, Coldplay Live 2003, and released on 6 October 2003 as a promotional single.

Background
The song was written about lead singer Chris Martin's then wife, Gwyneth Paltrow. He said that it is "about falling in love with the most beautiful woman in the world."
The title later served as the namesake for the couple’s second child, Moses Bruce Anthony Martin.

Personnel
 Chris Martin – vocals, rhythm guitar
 Jonny Buckland – lead guitar
 Guy Berryman – bass guitar
 Will Champion – drums

Track listing

Chart performance

Release history

References

2003 singles
2003 songs
Coldplay songs
Parlophone singles
Song recordings produced by Ken Nelson (British record producer)
Songs written by Guy Berryman
Songs written by Jonny Buckland
Songs written by Will Champion
Songs written by Chris Martin
Live singles